George County High School is a public high school in Lucedale, Mississippi, United States. It is a part of the George County School District.

Athletics 
The following sports are offered at George County:

 Band
 Baseball
 Basketball
 Color Guard
 Cheer
 Cross Country
 Dance
 Football
 Golf
 Powerlifting
 Soccer
 Softball
 Tennis
 Track
 Volleyball

Demographics 
For the 2014–15 school year, 87% of the student body at George County identified as Caucasian, making up the majority. 11% identified as African American, 2% as Hispanic, 1% as Asian, 0.3% as mixed and 0.2% as Native American. The student body makeup is 52% female and 48% male.

References

External links
 

Education in George County, Mississippi
Public high schools in Mississippi